Deepak Ohri (born 9 February 1968) is an author, entrepreneur, business leader, public speaker, lecturer, and mentor.

Biography 
Ohri graduated from the Institute of Hotel Management and the Indian Institute of Management. He started his career at the Indian Tourism Development Corporation. Ohri's early tenure included hospitality groups: Kempinski Hotels and Taj Hotels.

Ohri has lectured at the Indian Institute of Management Bangalore (IIMB) & ISB Hyderabad, INSEAD and Harvard Business School, Columbia University, NYU Stern School of Business,  MIT Sloan, INSEAD and Florida International University. He also provides mentorship to business students.

In 2019 Deepak Ohri was named a World’s Leading Travel Personality, a recognition granted by the World Travel Awards.

International Hospitality Institute selected Deepak Ohri as one of the Global Top Most Inspirational Executives in Travel and Hospitality.

Deepak Ohri co-created and co-designed Luxury Incubator Project for the MBA Program at Florida International University. The Luxury Incubator Project was co-designed with Dr.Anna Pietraszek, Director of Global Operations, Faculty Fellow in Entrepreneurship and Innovation and Marketing Faculty at FIU. The project is first of its kind offered by the university.

In May 2022, Deepak Ohri joined the World Happiness Foundation as an Advisory Board Member and created a Happiness Office at lebua assuming additional responsibilities as a Chief Happiness Officer (CHO).

In July 2022, Deepak Ohri was recognized as a global leader in luxury   and International Hospitality Institute named Ohri as one of the 100 Most Powerful People in Global Hospitality.

Deepak Ohri is an author of a book: A Bridge Not Too Far, Where Creativity Meets Innovation. The book explores how his humble beginnings have fueled his innovative entrepreneurial spirit and have informed his deeply human-centered approach to business and to life. The book is adopted as case-study teaching material for the executive education courses and was selected as the Top 25 Best Global Marketing books.  The Father of Modern Marketing, Prof. Philip Kotler selected A Bridge Not Too Far as one of the four marketing books that he recommends. 

Deepak Ohri is an inventor of Ohri Luxury Index, a tool that measures emotional experience in luxury and how such knowledge can elevate a value of a luxury brand.   He is the president of Luxury Atelier Maison Happiness (LAMH ), a luxury consulting company that prepares and delivers executive-level training courses in luxury marketing and management, one-on-one well-being sessions, and executive retreats for the global business leaders, companies, and students. 

The business case study: lebua: A Thai Luxury Hotel’s Post-Pandemic Dilemmas, published by Ivey Publishing (July 2022) and offered by Harvard Business Publishing (November 2022) demonstrates Ohri's approach to management, strategy and marketing of the luxury market and properties, and his vision in a time of crisis.

The Experiential Immersion by Deepak Ohri, a brand new education opportunity based on experiential learning techniques developed by Ohri, it was designed for the Faculty Professional Development Program in International Business in collaboration with the Pino Global Entrepreneurship Center and CIBER (Center for International Business Education and Research) at FIU. Ohri directed a group of 15 faculty from several U.S. higher institutions who learned about Thai culture and business principles in Asia. It is a second experiential learning program co-created with Dr.Anna Pietraszek, Faculty Fellow in Entrepreneurship and Innovation at FIU. Their third experiential learning program is designed for business faculty to discover, experience and learn management principals in Antarctica. 

Koktail Magazine and Thailand's Favorite Restaurants Guide 2022 recognized Deepak Ohri for his contribution to Thailand's Hospitality Industry with the Thailand's Best award.

In October 2022, Deepak Ohri and the father of modern marketing Prof.Philip Kotler discussed the new approach to "De-marketing and Happiness in the Post Covid19 Era" ,in the live webinar moderated by the president of the Happiness Foundation. The webinar was part of the Faculty Professional Development Program: Experiential Immersion by Deepak Ohri, in collaboration with the Pino Global Entrepreneurship Center and Center for International Business and Research at Florida International University. Deepak Ohri defined the concept of happiness as an expression of management and an achievement to obtain a perfect balance between the right and left sides of the brain.

Deepak Ohri presented his vision on happiness and tourism at the Tourism Innovation Summit 2022 in Seville, Spain. He highlighted the importance of finding happiness within.

In November 2022, Deepak Ohri was named the World's Leading Happiness Ambassador by the World Travel Awards.

In February 2022,  Hotel-Asia highlighted the success of Deepak Ohri's book, A Bridge Not Too Far,  in the leading article: "A Man Who Has The Last Laugh".  The book also became Amazon's number one bestseller in sales in India.     

Deepak Ohri is an opinion columnist (C-Suite Advisory section) for the CEOWorld Magazine.

Notable Speaking Events 
 INSEAD Business School of the World, Paris
 Harvard Kennedy School, US
 Harvard Business School
 New York Times International Luxury Conference
 WTTC, Brazil
 WTTC, Thailand
 WTTC, Spain
 Entrepreneurial Summit of IIM Bangalore, India
 India Conference, Harvard
 India Conference, Columbia Business School
 INSEAD Global Luxury Forum, Switzerland
 World Travel and Tourism Council, Japan
 Global Tourism Economy Forum, China
 The Economy Hotels World Asia Conference, Singapore
 Real Estate Funds and Emerging Markets Conference, NYC
 The Financial Times Business of Luxury Summit, LA
 Worldwide TRI*M Conference, New York
 Forbes Global CEO Conference, Singapore
 Cityscape Conference, Singapore
 World Travel and Tourism Council Global Travel and Tourism Summit.
 “Entrepreneurship Through the Eyes of Luxury”  Pino Global Entrepreneurship Center at FIU Business, Florida International University
 "Innovate the Innovation" - Entrepreneurial Approach to Innovation with Real Madrid
 “Expanding Horizons: The Hospitalitization of the Real Estate Industry,” Wertheim Lecture Series by FIU's Hollo School of Real Estate 
 "Creating Global Community, Taking Students Out of the Classroom: An Experiential Learning and Inclusiveness Approach" Academy of International Business Conference (AIB), Miami 2022
 "Digital Marketing Analytics for Today’s World" Keynote and Guest of Honor at Amity University Uttar Pradesh, in collaboration with Indian Technical & Economic Cooperation (ITEC) program of the Ministry of External Affairs of India, September 2022
 Executive MBA Consortium - Global Business Innovation - International Week 2022 - Keynote Speaker 
 "What Travellers Want? Insights Into the Ever Changing Needs of Travellers", Opening Session at Elevate Booking.com, Singapore, October 2022
 "De-marketing and Happiness in the Post Covid19 era, a Dialogue with Prof.Philip Kotler, Father of Modern Marketing", Thailand / USA   
 "Redefining Travel in the Changing World", CEO's and Leadership Panel, Tourism Innovation Summit, Seville, Spain 2022  
 "Happiness and the Future of Tourism", Distribution Channels Forum, Tourism Innovation Summit, Seville, Spain 2022

TV Interviews 

 Bloomberg High Flyers with Deepak Ohri 
 Koktail Conversations with Nigel Oakins  Episode 2 Deepak Ohri, CEO of Lebua Hotels
 BBC The CEO EDIT with Deepak Ohri 
 CNBC - Deepak Ohri on TOURISM IN THAILAND

Podcasts / Webinars 

 The Brain and Brand Show: Secrets of Unconscious Mind - Application  Timothy Maurice Webster speaks to Deepak Ohri, about how to apply the secrets of the unconscious mind.
 School for Startups Radio with Jim Beach: Jim Beach and Deepak Ohri discuss Deepak's career and journey. 
 MisFit Entrepreneur:  Your Bridge is Not Too Far, How Deepak Ohri Changed the Hospitality Industry and Create the Life of His Dreams 
 Deepak Ohri with Shalom Klein on Get Down To Business 
 Conversations with Entrepreneurs / CEO Series: Deepak Ohri and Marc Lore 
 The Remarkable Leadership by Kevin Eikenberry: Where Creativity Meets Innovation with Deepak Ohri

Speaking Engagements (recordings) 

 De-marketing and Happiness, dialogue with Philip Kotler, Father of Modern Marketing and Deepak Ohri 
 Elevate Booking.com Singapore 2022
 Experiential Immersion by Deepak Ohri
 Entrepreneurship Disruptive Business Models | Columbia University
 Deepak Ohri's Lecture at INSEAD: The Business School for the World
 Deepak Ohri's Lecture at Harvard Business School

A Bridge Not Too Far by Deepak Ohri (REVIEWS) 

 Kirkus Review 
 Independent Book Review

References 

Indian chief executives
1968 births
Living people
Indian hoteliers
Indian Institute of Management Bangalore alumni